The 1955–56 Hellenic Football League season was the third in the history of the Hellenic Football League, a football competition in England.

Clubs

The league featured 17 clubs which competed in the last season, along with one new club:
Dunstable Town reserves

League table

References

External links
 Hellenic Football League

1955-56
H